State Route 351 (SR 351) is a state highway in Greene County, Tennessee. It begins at State Routes 70 and 107 in southern Greene County and ends at State Route 93 in northern Greene County. It forms a half loop around Greeneville and Tusculum.

Route description
SR 351 begins at a y-intersection with SR 70 and SR 107 near South Greene. It goes northeast as State Route 107 cutoff, where it winds its way through farmland, running parallel to the Nolichucky River, to have an intersection with SR 350. SR 351 continues northeast to become concurrent with SR 107, where it becomes known as Erwin Highway as they turn southeast. They pass through rural areas before SR 351 splits off at a y-intersection as Chuckey Pike. It winds its way northwest through farmland before crossing a bridge over the Nolichucky River, where it leaves the river for good, before passing through Chuckey, where it has an intersection with US 11E/US 321/SR 34. SR 351 continues northwest as Rheatown Road through rural areas before entering Newmansville and coming to an end at an intersection with SR 93.

SR 351 is a rural 2-lane highway for its entire length.

2010 widening project
Improvements were made to 351's 2nd intersection with SR 107 on the south Side of Tusculum in 2010 which widened the intersection and installed a traffic light/signal.

Major intersections

References

Transportation in Greene County, Tennessee
351